Corey Andrew Knebel (born November 26, 1991) is an American professional baseball pitcher who is a free agent. He has played in Major League Baseball (MLB) for the Detroit Tigers, Milwaukee Brewers, Los Angeles Dodgers and Philadelphia Phillies.

Early life
Knebel was born in Denton, Texas to parents Jeffrey and Melissa Knebel and grew up in Bastrop County, Texas. He attended Bastrop High School where he was a three-year letter winner and a former district MVP in baseball. He was also a member of the school's basketball team. He is a graduate of Georgetown High School, where he moved for his senior season.

College career
Knebel enrolled at the University of Texas in 2011, and played college baseball for the Texas Longhorns baseball team. He became the Longhorn's closer as a freshman and tied J. Brent Cox and Charlie Thames' school records for saves in a single season with 19. He was named the NCBWA Stopper of the Year and the Freshman of the Year by the NBCWA and Collegiate Baseball Magazine. Knebel earned First Team All-American and first-team All-Big 12 Conference honors.

Knebel was again the Longhorn closer in 2012, finishing the year with nine saves and a 2.08 earned run average. Though unable to match the accolades of his freshman season, he again earned first-team All-Big 12 honors.

Knebel was suspended from the Longhorns twice in 2013, once for violating team rules and once for providing a urine sample to help a teammate beat a drug test.

Professional career

Detroit Tigers
Knebel was drafted by the Detroit Tigers as the 39th pick in the 2013 Major League Baseball Draft. This supplemental pick was the first traded draft slot in Major League history. The pick was included in a 2012 trade between the Tigers and the Miami Marlins, which included Aníbal Sánchez, Omar Infante, and Jacob Turner. Knebel played for the Class-A West Michigan Whitecaps, the Double-A Erie SeaWolves and the Triple-A Toledo Mud Hens before being called up by the Tigers. He made his major league debut on May 24, 2014, against the Texas Rangers.

Texas Rangers
On July 23, 2014, the Tigers traded Knebel and Jake Thompson to the Texas Rangers, in exchange for reliever Joakim Soria. After the trade, Knebel was assigned to play for the Rangers' Triple-A team, the Round Rock Express. Knebel sprained the ulnar collateral ligament of the elbow in his throwing arm in August, ending his season.

Milwaukee Brewers
On January 19, 2015, the Rangers traded Knebel, Luis Sardiñas, and Marcos Diplan to the Milwaukee Brewers for Yovani Gallardo.

In May 2017, Knebel became the permanent closer for the Brewers, taking the job from a struggling Neftalí Feliz. On June 22, Knebel set the MLB record for most consecutive appearances with at least one strikeout by a relief pitcher at 38. The record was previously set in 2014 by Aroldis Chapman with the Cincinnati Reds. On July 19, Knebel's streak ended at 45 games after failing to record a strikeout in a blown save against the Pittsburgh Pirates.

Knebel injured his left hamstring while pitching on April 5, 2018, against the Chicago Cubs and was placed on the disabled list. He was activated on May 9. However, Knebel struggled among his return to the Brewers, and he was demoted to the Colorado Springs Sky Sox after compiling a 2–3 record with a 5.08 ERA in 41 appearances.

Shortly after 2019 opening day, Knebel was dealing with soreness in his right elbow. It was eventually revealed that his right elbow had a torn UCL, which needed Tommy John surgery, putting Knebel away for the rest of 2019. On December 2, Knebel was designated for assignment by the Brewers.

In the shortened 2020 season, Knebel returned and recorded a 6.08 ERA in  innings over 15 games.

Los Angeles Dodgers
On December 2, 2020, the Brewers traded Knebel to the Los Angeles Dodgers in exchange for Leo Crawford.

On May 2, 2021, Knebel was placed on the 60-day injured list with a right lat strain, an injury that kept him sidelined until August 10. As a result of the injury he only appeared in 27 games for the Dodgers in 2021, including four appearances as an opener, and finished with a 4–0 record, 2.45 ERA, three saves and 30 strikeouts. In the postseason, he appeared in seven games (including two as an opener), pitching 5 innings and allowing two runs on five hits and one walk while striking out 11.

Philadelphia Phillies
On December 1, 2021, Knebel officially signed a 1-year contract with the Philadelphia Phillies.

Personal life
Knebel married longtime girlfriend Danielle Matula on December 5, 2015, in Victoria, Texas. The couple have two children and reside in Austin, Texas.

References

External links

1991 births
All-American college baseball players
Baseball players from Texas
Colorado Springs Sky Sox players
Detroit Tigers players
Erie SeaWolves players
Living people
Los Angeles Dodgers players
Major League Baseball pitchers
Mesa Solar Sox players
Milwaukee Brewers players
National League All-Stars
Oklahoma City Dodgers players
Philadelphia Phillies players
Sportspeople from Denton, Texas
Round Rock Express players
Texas Longhorns baseball players
Toledo Mud Hens players
West Michigan Whitecaps players